Sunray High School is a public high school located in Sunray, Texas, United States, and classified as a 2A school by the UIL. It is part of the Sunray Independent School District located in northeast Moore County. In 2015, the school was rated "Met Standard" by the Texas Education Agency.

Athletics
The Sunray Bobcats compete in these sports - 

Basketball
Cross Country
Football
Golf
Powerlifting
Tennis
Track and Field
Baseball
Softball

State Titles
Girls Track - 
1979(1A)
2019(2A)

State Finalists
Boys Basketball - 
1960(1A)

References

External links
Sunray ISD

Public high schools in Texas
Education in Moore County, Texas